Fear City is a 1984 American neo-noir erotic thriller film directed by Abel Ferrara and starring Tom Berenger, Billy Dee Williams, Jack Scalia, and Melanie Griffith. The screenplay was written by longtime Ferrara collaborator Nicholas St. John. It is considered a cult film.

The film follows a haunted former boxer turned mob-connected nightclub promoter (Berenger) and a fiercely driven police Detective (Williams), investigating a brutal serial killer targeting strippers in Manhattan.

Plot
Best friends Matt Rossi and Nicky Parzeno run a management company for Manhattan’s best exotic dancers, managing and booking their clients into clubs across the borough. Rossi was once in a relationship with their top client Loretta, but they broke up because Rossi's memories of accidentally killing an opponent in the ring during his days as a professional boxer left him emotionally barren. Loretta still cares for Matt but has moved onto a lesbian relationship with a pretty young dancer named Leila.

One night, one of their dancers is targeted by a brutal assailant who beats and mutilates her. Rossi and Parzeno immediately suspect rival promoter Lou Goldstein, but he vehemently denies any involvement. Vice Detective Al Wheeler is put on the case, displaying nothing but contempt towards Rossi and his colleagues and their occupation, and convinced that they know more than they’re letting on. Soon, Leila is also attacked by the unknown stalker and is hospitalized with severe injuries, leaving Rossi and Parzeno’s clients unwilling to work for fear of being targeted. The movie spends time showing the killer, a young man with a cold expression on his face, writing about his attacks and going through martial-arts routines in his barren loft that has human anatomy posters on the walls (the doctors from his earlier assaults note that the slashes to the women avoided any potentially lethal arteries or organ areas).

Rossi and Loretta slowly begin to rekindle their relationship, while Wheeler begins to suspect that the attacks may not be gang-related, but instead the work of a single person. When another dancer is killed in her own apartment, and one of Goldstein's dancers is murdered in a park, Parzeno and Goldstein reach an agreement to provide security and transportation for their dancers. But after another dancer is decapitated by a sword, Rossi and Parzeno’s business is left effectively destitute. Loretta begins a downward spiral into drug addiction after Leila dies of her injuries in the hospital. Rossi and Parzeno stalk and attack a man in one of their clubs, mistakenly believing he’s the killer, and drawing the ire of Wheeler in the process.

While Matt is harshly interrogated by the Detective, Parzeno and his girlfriend Ruby are ambushed by the killer. They manage to fend him off long enough for help to arrive, but Parzeno is severely injured and hospitalized in the process. Hungry for vengeance and seeking guidance, Rossi visits a local mafioso named Carmine, with whom he built omerta many years ago when he witnessed him kill someone in a drive-by shooting and didn't report it to the police. Carmine tells Rossi in no uncertain terms to find the assailant and kill him, and Rossi begins preparing himself for the inevitable encounter.

When Loretta asks Ruby for money, Ruby gives her cab fare, and directs her to go straight home. However, Loretta takes the money to her dealer, where she discovers his body hanging in an alley. The attacker, laying in wait, stabs Loretta in the leg before Rossi arrives, and a fight ensues. Loretta goes for help as Matt takes several hits. Matt then taps into his boxing memories and begins landing bunches of punches against the killer, leaving the man's face bloody and swollen before winding up for a final belt that sends the guy crashing unconscious to the pavement. Wheeler and his partner show up, confirming that the killer has now been killed. Loretta is brought back to the scene by patrolmen whom she told of the attack and embraces Rossi. Wheeler softens towards Rossi, saying he just might be a hero, and letting him leave the area with Loretta.

Cast
 Tom Berenger as Matt Rossi 
 Billy Dee Williams as Detective Al Wheeler 
 Jack Scalia as Nicky Parzeno 
 Melanie Griffith as Loretta 
 Michael V. Gazzo as Mike
 Rossano Brazzi as Carmine 
 Rae Dawn Chong as Leila 
 Janet Julian as Ruby
 John Foster as Pazzo, The Killer
 María Conchita as "Silver"
 Joe Santos as Frank
 Ola Ray as "Honey"
 Tracy Griffith as Sandra Cook
 Emilia Crow as Bibi (as Emilia Lesniak) 
 Jan Murray as Lou Goldstein
 Daniel Faraldo as Sanchez

Release

Theatrical
Fear City premiered in New York, opening on February 15, 1985, and in Los Angeles on March 8, 1985.

Home media
It was originally released on DVD on November 28, 2000, through Anchor Bay Entertainment with the theatrical trailer as a special feature.
On July 17, 2012, the film was released in the United States on Blu-ray Disc by Shout! Factory and includes the approximate 97-minute uncut version and the 95-minute theatrical film release. The sole extra feature is a theatrical trailer.

Reception

Critical response
The film received mixed reviews from critics. On review aggregator Rotten Tomatoes, the film holds an approval rating of 64% based on 11 reviews, with an average rating of 5.6/10. 
The New York Times film critic Janet Maslin said "Fear City also showcases Mr. Ferrara's skill with action scenes and with nonverbal narration." Maslin continues and describes "Mr. Ferrara's visual talent for the unexpected is not matched by an equivalent gift for character development, but Fear City doesn't attempt to make personality its strong suit. Its biggest selling points, quick pacing and a bright, hard-edged look, are as much as the genre requires."
For the Chicago Tribune Gene Siskel criticized the soulfulness of the characters as "Fear City is concerned only with surface thrills--exotic dancers, the martial arts, knife attacks and knockout punches."

References

External links
 
 
 

1984 films
1984 action thriller films
1984 crime films
1980s crime action films
1980s crime thriller films
1980s English-language films
American action thriller films
American crime action films
American crime thriller films
American neo-noir films
American police detective films
Films about the American Mafia
Films about the New York City Police Department
Films about striptease
Films directed by Abel Ferrara
Films scored by Joe Delia
Films set in New York City
Films shot in Los Angeles
Films shot in New York City
1980s American films